Mind Twist was an Australian children's game show series aired on Network Ten from 1992 to 1993. It was hosted by Maynard.

Network 10 original programming
Australian children's game shows
1992 Australian television series debuts
1993 Australian television series endings
1990s Australian game shows
English-language television shows